Enormous Changes at the Last Minute is a 1983 three-part drama film based on the 1974 short stories of the same name by Grace Paley, which was directed by Mirra Bank, Ellen Hovde and Muffie Meyer. The film stars Kevin Bacon, Ellen Barkin and David Strathairn, among others. The film was released in 1985 in the United States.

Cast
 Kevin Bacon as Dennis
 Maria Tucci as Alexandra
 Ellen Barkin as Virginia
 David Strathairn as Jerry
Lynn Milgrim as Faith
 Ron McLarty as John Raftery
 Jeffrey DeMunn as Ricardo
 Steven Gilborn as Phillip
 Giancarlo Esposito as Julio

Release
The film was released by ABC. The film was selected at the Toronto International Film Festival in 1983 and London Film Festival.

References

External links
 
 

1983 films
American drama films
ABC network original films
1980s English-language films
1980s American films